This article lists the confirmed squads lists for 2017 Sultan Azlan Shah Cup.

Group













References

Sultan Azlan Shah Cup